Quest Adventure is an adventure video game written by Kim Topley for the ZX Spectrum and published by Hewson Consultants in 1983.

Gameplay
Quest Adventure is a game in which the player must locate a map and an ancient scroll.

Reception
Daniel T Canavan reviewed Quest for Imagine magazine, and stated that "To anyone who enjoys a good adventure, Ouest is highly recommended."

Hewson expected players to be able to solve this game within six months, but 15-year old gamer Frazer Hubbard and his cousin solved Quest Adventure in only six weeks. Hubbard soon joined Crash'''s team of young reviewers for adventure games, and also helped launch an Adventurer's Help Line.

ReviewsCrashGames ComputingHome Computing WeeklySinclair User''

References

External links 
 Quest Adventure at MobyGames
 

1980s interactive fiction
1983 video games
Europe-exclusive video games
Fantasy video games
Hewson Consultants games
Video games developed in the United Kingdom
ZX Spectrum-only games